The 46th British Academy Film Awards, given by the British Academy of Film and Television Arts in 1993, honoured the best films of 1992.

James Ivory's Howards End won the awards for Best Film and Best Actress (Emma Thompson). Robert Downey Jr. was voted Best Actor for his role in Chaplin. Best Supporting Actor and Actress were Gene Hackman (Unforgiven) and Miranda Richardson (Damage). Robert Altman won the award for Best Director for directing The Player.

Winners and nominees

Statistics

See also
 65th Academy Awards
 18th César Awards
 45th Directors Guild of America Awards
 6th European Film Awards
 50th Golden Globe Awards
 4th Golden Laurel Awards
 13th Golden Raspberry Awards
 7th Goya Awards
 8th Independent Spirit Awards
 19th Saturn Awards
 45th Writers Guild of America Awards

References 

Film046
British Academy Film Awards
British Academy Film Awards
March 1993 events in the United Kingdom
1992 awards in the United Kingdom